Sir Richard Kaye, 6th Baronet, LL.D (1736–25 December 1809) was an English peer, churchman and scientist. He was Dean of Lincoln from 1783, and inherited the baronetcy from his elder brother Sir John Lister Kaye, 5th Baronet in 1789.

Life

He was educated at Brasenose College, Oxford graduating BCL in 1761. He was a patron of the artists Samuel Hieronymus Grimm, whom he commissioned for two decades to draw "everything curious", and Tilly Kettle.  He was a friend of Joseph Banks whom he proposed for the Royal Society, and also Captain James Cook: Cook named after him the island now called Kayak Island. He was a member of the Madrigal Society, and also a Trustee of the British Museum. He married Ellen Fenton, daughter of William Fenton of Rothwell, West Yorkshire and widow of Thomas Mainwaring. In 1789 he was to inherit a baronetcy.  He left no children, and the baronetcy came to an end with him.

Clerical career
Kaye was noted both for his piety but also as a great pluralist holding many rich livings in the Church of England at the same time. Following graduation, in 1762 he was appointed chaplain to the Duke of Portland. Then in 1765 he became rector of Kirkby in Ashfield in 1765, a position he owed to the Dowager Duchess of Portland, and which he retained until his death. In this parish dissenters and methodists following John Wesley made up the greatest part of the population, but Kaye was able to bring most of the population to return to worshiping at the parish church. His notebook recording life in the parish is now in British Library. After about 1770 Grimm was to portray life in the parish with pictures of harvest devotions and the village schoolchildren attending a church service. Only a year after moving to Kirby he was appointed in 1766, a Chaplain in Ordinary within the Royal Household and in 1768 he became a Sub-Almoner. His next move forward was in 1780 when he was appointed Archdeacon of Nottingham. He had already been appointed Vicar of Clayworth. In 1783 he became prebend of North Muskham at Southwell Minster. 

In 1788 he became curate of Marylebone in 1788.  He had a prebend as a residential canon at Lincoln from 1783 for life, at Durham, from 1777 to 1784 (leading Grimm to sketch in the north-east), and one at Southwell. He held all these positions together with being Dean of Lincoln from 1783 to 1809 and he resided at the Deanery in Lincoln, which was drawn by Hieronymus Grimm.

References

Bibliography

Further reading
 

Hauptmann W. (2014), Samuel Hieronymous Grimm (1733–1794): A very English Swiss, Kunst Museum, Bern. .

External links
An Itinerary of Nottingham: Kaye's Walk, St Mary's Gate and Pilcher Gate

1736 births
1809 deaths
Fellows of the Royal Society
Fellows of the Society of Antiquaries of London
Deans of Lincoln
Archdeacons of Nottingham
Baronets in the Baronetage of England